Bawai is located in the Rudraprayag tehsil of Rudraprayag district of Uttarakhand, India. It is largest village of Rudraprayag.

Population

Bawai has 297 households with a total population of 1329, 622 male and 707 female, making the Sex ratio 1137 females per 1000 males.
Overall literacy rate is 88.04% with a male literacy rate of 98.27% and a female literacy rate 79.38%.

References

Villages in Rudraprayag district